is a Japanese light novel series written by Shobonnu and illustrated by Sogawa. It was serialized online between August 2016 and May 2018 on the user-generated novel publishing website Shōsetsuka ni Narō. It was later acquired by Futabasha, who have published five volumes from March 2017 to November 2018 under their Monster Bunko imprint. A manga adaptation with art by Aki Taruto has been serialized via Futabasha's digital publication Web Comic Action since April 2018. It has been collected in nine tankōbon volumes. An anime television series adaptation by Studio A-Cat aired from October to December 2022.

Characters

Media

Light novels
The series written by Shobonnu was serialized online from August 2016 to May 2018 on the user-generated novel publishing website Shōsetsuka ni Narō. It was later acquired by Futabasha, who published the series as a light novel under their Monster Bunko imprint with illustrations by Sogawa in five volumes from March 30, 2017 to November 30, 2018.

Manga
A manga adaptation with art by Aki Taruto has been serialized via Futabasha's digital publication Web Comic Action since April 2018. It has been collected in nine tankōbon volumes as of 30 September 2022.

Anime
On February 26, 2022, an anime television series adaptation was announced. The series is produced by Studio A-Cat and directed by Norihiko Nagahama, with scripts written by Touko Machida, character designs handled by Masami Sueoka, and music composed by Takurō Iga. It aired from October 1 to December 17, 2022, on Tokyo MX, SUN, BS NTV, and HTB. 7ORDER will perform the opening theme song "Growing up", while Pop Shinanaide will perform the ending theme song . Sentai Filmworks has licensed the series,  but has instead delayed the first episode's simulcast by a week to October 8, alongside the second episode.

Episode list

Notes

References

External links
 at Shōsetsuka ni Narō 
 
 
 

2017 Japanese novels
Agriculture and farming in anime and manga
Anime and manga based on light novels
Fantasy anime and manga
Futabasha manga
Japanese webcomics
Light novels
Light novels first published online
Seinen manga
Sentai Filmworks
Shōsetsuka ni Narō
Studio A-Cat
Webcomics in print